Edith Massey may refer to:

 Edith Massey (1863–1946), Welsh botanist and painter, one of the two Massey Sisters
Edith Massey (actress) (1918–1984), American actress and singer